Aroona may refer to the following:

Places

Australia
Queensland
Aroona, Queensland, a suburb
South Australia
Aroona Dam, a water storage facility in the locality of Leigh Creek
Aroona Sanctuary, a private protected area associated with the Aroona Dam 
Aroona Station, a pastoral lease in the Flinders Ranges
Aroona Valley, a valley in South Australia - refer List of valleys of Australia

Other
Aroona Palace, a music recording by Tinpan Orange.